General elections were held in the Cook Islands on 16 June 1999 to elect 25 MPs to the Parliament.  The Cook Islands Party won 11 seats, the Democratic Alliance Party 10 seats, and the New Alliance Party 4 seats.

Results

Aftermath
Following the elections, the CIP formed a coalition with the NAP, with Geoffrey Henry as Prime Minister and NAP leader Norman George as his deputy.  However, three members of the CIP subsequently quit the party and joined the Democrats, forcing Henry's resignation.  Joe Williams subsequently became Prime Minister, but was forced to resign in November following a by-election and further coalition realignment.  Finally, the Democratic party's Terepai Maoate became Prime Minister, with George as his deputy.

References

Elections in the Cook Islands
Cook
1999 in the Cook Islands
Cook
Election and referendum articles with incomplete results